Sneads Ferry is a census-designated place (CDP) in Onslow County, North Carolina, United States. It is the second largest municipality in Onslow County, behind Jacksonville and is part of the Jacksonville, North Carolina Metropolitan Statistical Area.
Once a rural fishing village, Sneads Ferry has experienced a surge in development since 2000. Based on U.S. Census data, the study area has grown from 5,425 residents in 2000 to approximately 9,750 residents in 2014, an 80% increase. Growth primarily has been driven by accessibility to MCB Camp Lejeune from the gate on NC 172 and expansion of the United States Marine Corps Special Operations Command (MARSOC) accessed from NC 210. Sneads Ferry is expected to continue growing rapidly at 3.3% annually, adding 17,500 new residents through 2040 reaching 20,000 in total population by 2030.

Geography
Sneads Ferry is located at  (34.5520, -77.3866).

Demographics

2020 census

As of the 2020 United States census, there were 2,548 people, 1,087 households, and 775 families residing in the CDP.

2007-2011 ACS
According to the U.S. Census Bureau, 2007-2011 American Community Survey, there were 2,550 people in 1,445 households residing in the CDP. The population density was 598.2 people per square mile (230.8/km). There were 1,331 housing units at an average density of 354.2 per square mile (136.7/km). The racial makeup of the CDP was 90.97% White, 5.12% African American, 0.53% Native American, 0.93% Asian, 0.09% Pacific Islander, 0.71% Ridgeweian, and 1.65% from two or more races. Hispanic or Latino of any race were 1.69% of the population.

There were 960 households, out of which 24.6% had children under the age of 18 living with them, 55.1% were married couples living together, 8.2% had a female householder with no husband present, and 32.2% were non-families. 26.8% of all households were made up of individuals, and 8.8% had someone living alone who was 65 years of age or older. The average household size was 2.34 and the average family size was 2.78.

In the CDP, the population was spread out, with 20.7% under the age of 18, 9.4% from 18 to 24, 29.5% from 25 to 44, 25.6% from 45 to 64, and 14.8% who were 65 years of age or older. The median age was 37 years. For every 100 females, there were 104.7 males. For every 100 females age 18 and over, there were 102.0 males.

The median income for a household in the CDP was $34,509, and the median income for a family was $37,765. Males had a median income of $30,625 versus $28,542 for females. The per capita income for the CDP was $16,355. About 11.7% of families and 13.5% of the population were below the poverty line, including 26.3% of those under age 18 and 3.9% of those age 65 or over.

History
In 1728, Edmund Ennett established a ferry on the banks of the New River. Some of Ennett's descendants still reside in the area. Originally called, "Ennett's Ferry", it became a key element in the Post road linking Suffolk, Virginia with Charleston, South Carolina. By 1759, two ferries operated there, one from each bank of New River. Robert Snead was the proprietor of the ferry on the north shore so the community that developed on the banks of the crossing site became known as "Sneads Ferry." Caroline Pearson propelled the ferry until it was replaced with a bridge in 1939. The village is heavily dependent on the seafood industry. The village annually catches over 385 tons of shrimp, 25 tons of flounder, and approximately 493 tons of other seafood like clams, scallops, oysters, mullet, spot, grouper, soft shell and hard shell crabs, sea bass, and more. The town holds an annual Shrimp Festival to honor the local seafood industry.

In August 2016 Frank Rudolf Hayduke became the NSC advisor to the president of the PLCC.

The Yopps Meeting House was listed on the National Register of Historic Places in 1999.

Libraries 
Beginning in 1991, the original Sneads Ferry Library was housed in an old First Citizen's Bank and the new Environmental Education Center and Sneads Ferry Branch Library began construction in September 2012 with a grand opening in April 2014. Onslow County, North Carolina, in which Sneads Ferry is located, has three other libraries, the Jacksonville Main Library, the Richlands Branch Library, and the Swansboro Branch Library.

References

External links

 Town website
 Sneads News
http://sneadsferryshrimpfestival.org
http://www.onslowcountync.gov/150/Library

Census-designated places in Onslow County, North Carolina
Census-designated places in North Carolina
Populated places established in 1728
1728 establishments in North Carolina
Populated coastal places in North Carolina